A referendum on the creation of the territory of Nunavut was held between 3 and 5 November 1992 in the territory set to become the new territory. It was approved by 69% of voters. On 25 May 1993 the Mulroney government and the Tunngavik Federation of Nunavut signed the Nunavut Land Claims Agreement.  On 10 June 1993 the parliament of Canada passed two laws dividing the Northwest Territories and providing for the formation of Nunavut on 1 April 1999.

Background
A 1982 referendum had approved the division of the Northwest Territories and the creation of a new territory, later to become Nunavut. The government of Canada gave a conditional agreement to the plan seven months later. In December 1991 the federal government reached an agreement with the Inuit on their land claims, with the "Parker line" set as the boundary between the existing territory and the new one. This was approved in a referendum in May 1992.

Results

References

See also
1982 Northwest Territories division plebiscite
Nunavut Land Claims Agreement

Referendums in the Northwest Territories
Referendums in Nunavut
Politics of Nunavut
History of Nunavut
1992 in Nunavut
1992 referendums
November 1992 events in Canada
Administrative division referendums